is a private, co-educational university located on the western edge of the city of Kobe, in Hyōgo Prefecture in Japan. It was founded in 1966 and overlooks the city of Akashi, the Akashi Straits and the Akashi Kaikyo Bridge - the longest suspension bridge in the world. The university has three campuses in Kobe. These are located near Akashi, near Nagata and on Port Island.

Brief Introduction
Kobe Gakuin University was founded in 1966 with Shigeki Mori as its first president. Initially offering a single course of study in the Faculty of Nutrition for 100 students, the university now contains nine faculties and seven graduate schools, and has expanded to two campuses. The largest private university integrating the cultural, social and natural studies in Kobe City, Kobe Gakuin University currently has a student body of 10,000 students, and is proud to have graduated over 80,000 students from its university graduate school courses.

Educational and Research Activities
In addition to working to improve specialized education and research capabilities at the faculty level, Kobe Gakuin University, together with the Institute for Promotion of Higher Education, established in 2014, will pursue the further improvement of general education at the university level as well as the administration of an inter-faculty education program.

International Activities
Ever since its founding in 1966, Kobe Gakuin University has been committed to promoting international exchange with the aim of developing human resources with an international perspective. To date, the University has established international partnership agreements with 29 institutions in eleven countries and has a solid track record in faculty interaction, student exchanges and sending students to study abroad, short-term overseas training and the sharing of scientific documentation, etc. Other international exchange programs include joint research with foreign researchers and symposia featuring prominent scientists and researchers as guests.

Faculties
 Faculty of Law
 Faculty of Economics
 Faculty of Humanities
 Faculty of Nutrition
 Faculty of Pharmaceutical Sciences
 Faculty of Rehabilitation
Faculty of Business Administration
Faculty of Contemporary Social Studies
Faculty of Global Communication
 Graduate School of Law
 Graduate School of Economics
 Graduate School of Humanities and Sciences
 Graduate School of Nutrition
 Graduate School of Pharmaceutical Sciences
 Graduate School of Food and Medicinal Sciences

References

External links
 Official Website (in Japanese)

Education in Kobe
Private universities and colleges in Japan
Universities and colleges in Hyōgo Prefecture
Buildings and structures in Kobe
1966 establishments in Japan
Educational institutions established in 1966
Kansai Collegiate American Football League